For Sri Lanka national football team results see:

 Sri Lanka national football team results (1950–79)
 Sri Lanka national football team results (1980–2009)
 Sri Lanka national football team results (2010–39)